Anton Ionescu (10 December 1939 – 7 March 2023) was a Romanian politician who served aș a Deputy.

References

1939 births
2023 deaths
20th-century Romanian politicians
National Liberal Party (Romania) politicians
Romanian Ministers of Transport
Members of the Chamber of Deputies (Romania)